List of United States Air Force air support operations squadrons identifies all air support operations squadrons in the United States Air Force. ASOS squadrons are made up of Tactical Air Control Party airmen, Air Liaison Officers and other support airmen.

References

Air Support Operations